Stade de la Tuilière is a football stadium in Lausanne, Switzerland. It is the current home of the football club FC Lausanne-Sport. The stadium has a capacity of 12,544.

FC Lausanne-Sport planned the construction of the stadium in 2017. Their stadium at the time, Stade Olympique de la Pontaise, was multi-purpose and the club wanted new infrastructure only for football. The stadium was funded by the City of Lausanne. It formally opened on 29 November 2020, as the hosts Lausanne lost 3–0 to BSC Young Boys in a Swiss Super League match.

References

External links
Stade de la Tuilière Official website
City of Lausanne Project site
Lausanne-Sport Stade Infrastructures

FC Lausanne-Sport
Football venues in Switzerland
Sports venues in Lausanne
Multi-purpose stadiums in Switzerland
Sports venues completed in 2020
2020 establishments in Switzerland
21st-century architecture in Switzerland